Dark Harvest may refer to:

Dark Harvest, novel by Karen Harper 2004
Dark Harvest (novel), a 2007 novel by Norman Partridge
Dark Harvest (upcoming film), a horror film adaptation of the 2007 novel, starring Casey Likes
Dark Harvest, an Illinois-based publisher of Night Visions (stories) and other horror fiction
Dark Harvest (2004 film), a low-budget slasher movie
Dark Harvest (2016 film), a Canadian pot movie
"Dark Harvest", an episode of the animated series Invader Zim (2001)
Dark Harvest Commando 1981 militant group